Patrick Looby (born 1958) is an Irish former hurler.  At club level he played with Drom & Inch and was also a member of the Tipperary senior hurling team. He usually lined out as a forward.

Career

Looby first played hurling at juvenile and underage levels with the Drom & Inch club. He eventually joined the club's senior team and won a Mid Tipperary Championship title in 1984. Looby first appeared on the inter-county scene with the Tipperary minor team that won the All-Ireland Minor Championship in 1976. He progressed onto the Tipperary under-21 team and an All-Ireland Under-21 Championship title in 1979. Looby subsequently made a number of league and championship appearances with the Tipperary senior hurling team between 1979 and 1980.

Honours

Drom & Inch
Mid Tipperary Senior Hurling Championship: 1984

Tipperary
National Hurling League: 1978-79
All-Ireland Under-21 Hurling Championship: 1979
Munster Under-21 Hurling Championship: 1979
All-Ireland Minor Hurling Championship: 1976
Munster Minor Hurling Championship: 1976

References

External links
 Pat Looby profile on Tipp GAA Archives website

1958 births
Living people
Drom-Inch hurlers
Tipperary inter-county hurlers